was a village located in Kitauonuma District, Niigata Prefecture, Japan.

As of 2003, the village had an estimated population of 6,433 and a density of 18.38 persons per km². The total area was 350.08 km².

On November 1, 2004, Yunotani, along with the towns of Horinouchi and Koide, and the villages of Hirokami, Irihirose and Sumon (all from Kitauonuma District), was merged to create the city of Uonuma.

Transportation

Highway

Local attractions
 Yunotani Onsen (:ja:湯之谷温泉郷)
 Imogawa Onsen, Oritate Onsen, Oyu Onsen, Tochiomata Onsen, etc.
 Okutadami Dam

See also
 Uonuma

External links
 Uonuma Tourist Association 

Dissolved municipalities of Niigata Prefecture
Uonuma, Niigata